Fulgogasparrea decipioides is a species of lichen in the family Teloschistaceae. It is found in Gangwon Province, South Korea. This species was originally described in 2011by Ulf Arup as a member of the large genus Caloplaca. The specific epithet decipioides refers to its similarity with Caloplaca decipiens. Arup and colleagues transferred it to genus Wetmoreana in 2013, before it was again transferred to Fulgogasparrea that same year, a genus in which it is the type species.

References

Teloschistales
Lichen species
Lichens described in 2011
Lichens of Asia